The 2011 League of Ireland Premier Division was the 27th season of the League of Ireland Premier Division. The league was also known as the Airtricity League for sponsorship reasons. The division featured 10 teams. Shamrock Rovers were champions while Sligo Rovers finished as runners-up.

Teams

Overview
The Premier Division consists of ten teams. Each team played every other team four times, twice at home and twice away, for a total of 36 matches. The league began on 4 March and ended on 29 October. Defending champions Shamrock Rovers retained the league title with victory over UCD on 25 October 2011.

Final table

Results

Matches 1–18

Matches 19–36

Awards

Top goalscorers

PFAI Players' Player of the Year

PFAI Young Player of the Year

PFAI Team of the Year

Player of the Month

Notes

Promotion/relegation play-off
Galway United, the tenth-placed team in the 2011 Premier Division, and Monaghan United, the third-placed team from the 2011 First Division, played off to see who would play in the 2012 Premier Division. The playoff was contested in a two-legged format.

Monaghan United won 5–1 on aggregate and were promoted to the Premier Division. Galway United were relegated to the First Division.

See also

 2011 Dundalk F.C. season
 2011 Shamrock Rovers F.C. season
 2011 League of Ireland First Division
 2011 A Championship
 2011 League of Ireland Cup

References

 
League of Ireland Premier Division seasons
1
1
Ireland
Ireland